Mona Magdy Salim is a Sudanese singer who in October 2018, under article 152 of the Sudanese Penal Code of 1999, was arrested for wearing "indecent clothes", lycra trousers.

See also
Islam in Sudan

References

20th-century Sudanese women singers
Living people
Year of birth missing (living people)
21st-century Sudanese women singers